Oberea pupillata is a species of beetle in the family Cerambycidae. It was described by Leonard Gyllenhaal in 1817, originally under the genus Saperda.

Distribution

This species has a wide distribution throughout Europe. It is present in Austria, Belarus, Belgium, Bosnia and Herzegovina, Croatia, Czech Republic (Bohemia, Moravia), Estonia, France, Germany, Greece, Hungary, Italy, Latvia, Lithuania, Moldova, North Macedonia, Poland, Romania, Russia, Slovakia, Slovenia, Spain, Switzerland and Ukraine.

Habitat
These beetles mainly inhabit sub-mountainous environments and forest edges, but they can also be found in parks where the host plant is present.

Description
These beetles have a long and slender body. Head, thorax and abdomen have all about same width, and elytra are not tapered. Head and antennae are black and antennae are shorter than body. Pronotum is orange with two elongated black spots on the sides. The elytra are mostly blackish, yellowish at the base and rather hairy. The body is orange, with black markings on the sides and below the abdomen. The last abdominal segment shows a black mark. The legs are orange.

This species in quite similar to Oberea oculata (Linnaeus, 1758).

Biology
Adults fly from May to September. The life cycle lasts from two to three years. Usually a single egg is laid in a branch of the host plant, after making an incision on the bark. Larvae are xylophagous. These stem borers live and feed mostly in longitudinal galleries on etruscan honeysuckle (Lonicera etrusca).

Bibliography
 Edmund Reitter: Fauna Germanica – Die Käfer des Deutschen Reiches. 5 Bände, Stuttgart K. G. Lutz 1908–1916, Digitale Bibliothek Band 134, Directmedia Publishing GmbH, Berlin 2006, 
 Gyllenhal Leonard (1817) Appendix ad C. J. Schönherr Synonymiam Insectorum. Descriptiones Novarum Specierum Insectorum, In Schönherr. Scaris, in Officina Lewerentziana 1 (3): 1-266
 Heiko Bellmann: Welches Insekt ist das? Franckh-Kosmos, Stuttgart 2005, 
 Tronquet, M. 2014. Catalogue des Coléoptères de France. Revue de l’Association Roussillonnaise d’Entomologie, 23 (Supplément): 1-1052

References

External links
 Lamiaires du monde 
  Alamy.com
 Photo at Gezieferwelt.de
 Insektenbox 
 Beetles (Coleoptera) and Coleopterologists

Beetles described in 1817
pupillata